Life of a Ghost is the third full-length album by Danish band Blue Foundation. It was released on 24 September 2007 in Europe via Virgin Music Denmark/EMI and in 2009 in the USA via Astralwerks. Recording sessions took place in Copenhagen from 2006 to 2007. Production was handled by Blue Foundation members Tobias Wilner and Bo Rande. The album peaked at number 12 in Denmark.

The song "Eyes On Fire" peaked at number 49 on the Billboard Heatseekers Songs chart, and was featured on the soundtrack to the 2008 film Twilight. "Eyes On Fire" was also remixed by Zeds Dead in 2009.

Track listing

Personnel

Tobias "Bichi" Wilner – main artist, lyrics & vocals (tracks: 1, 6, 9, 10), backing vocals (tracks: 2-5, 7, 11, 12), electric guitar (tracks: 1-4, 7, 8, 10-12), synthesizer (tracks: 1-3, 5, 6, 8, 12), drum programming (tracks: 1, 4, 7), acoustic guitar (tracks: 2, 4-6, 8, 10-12), bass (track 4), banjo (tracks: 7, 8), arranger, producer
Kirstine Stubbe Teglbjærg – main artist, lyrics (tracks: 2, 3, 5, 7, 8, 11), vocals (tracks: 2, 3, 5, 7, 8, 11, 12), backing vocals (tracks: 1, 4, 10)
Scott "MC Jabber" Martingell – main artist, lyrics (tracks: 1, 4, 5, 10, 12), vocals (tracks: 1, 4, 5, 12)
Bo Rande – main artist, backing vocals (tracks: 1, 3, 6, 9, 11, 12), synthesizer (tracks: 1-10, 12), piano (tracks: 1, 5-9, 11, 12), organ (track 2), chimes (tracks: 2, 5), horns (tracks: 3, 5, 7, 9, 10), harmonium (track 3), glockenspiel (tracks: 4, 10), flute (tracks: 6, 10), kalimba & trumpet (track 12),  arranger, producer
Sune Martin – main artist, bass (tracks: 1-3, 5, 8, 10-12), electric guitar (track 8)
Tatsuki Oshima – main artist, turntables (tracks: 1, 2, 4, 6, 9, 12)
Nikolaj Bundvig – drums (tracks: 1-8, 10-12), percussion (tracks: 1, 2, 4, 7, 8, 11, 12)
Mathias Hantho – violin (tracks: 3, 8)
Mathias Friis-Hansen – marimba (tracks: 6, 9, 11)
Tine Rehling – harp (tracks: 8, 9, 12)
Ab Mannov – electric guitar (track 10)
Lukas Bjørn Rande – soprano & tenor saxophone (track 10)
Richard Lowe – mixing
Aske Jørgensen – engineering
Simon Davey – mastering
Kent Baker – photography
Jan-Erik Stig – A&R
Jesper Graugaard – management

Charts

References

External links

2007 albums
Blue Foundation albums